Thomery station (French: Gare de Thomery) is a railway station in Thomery, Île-de-France, France.

The Station

The station is located on the Paris–Marseille railway line. The station is served by Transilien line R (Paris-Gare de Lyon).

The station was designed by the architect François-Alexis Cendrier, one of many he worked on for the railroad company Chemins de fer de Paris à Lyon et à la Méditerranée.

Train services
The following services currently call at Thomery:
local service (Transilien R) Paris–Melun–Montereau

See also
Transilien Paris–Lyon

External links

 
Transilien network map
Transilien website

Railway stations in Seine-et-Marne